Steven G. Gabbe is an American obstetrician-gynecologist, specializing in complications of pregnancy. He is the former Chief Executive Officer at The Ohio State University Medical Center and Senior Vice President for Health Sciences.  He is the namesake of Gabbe College, one of the four academic colleges of the Vanderbilt University School of Medicine, of which he formerly served as dean.

Career
On April 4, 2008, Gabbe was appointed Chief Executive Officer of the Ohio State University Medical Center and Senior Vice President of Health Sciences at Ohio State University by President Gordon Gee. Gabbe was at Ohio State University for nine years as a professor and chairman of obstetrics and gynecology in The Ohio State University College of Medicine.

He left in 1996 for the University of Washington and was recruited to Vanderbilt as Dean of the Vanderbilt School of Medicine by former Vanderbilt Chancellor Gordon Gee in March 2001.

He has authored over 175 research articles, and is the first author of the textbook, Obstetrics: Normal and Problem Pregnancies (Elsevier).

He was elected a member of the Institute of Medicine of the United States National Academy of Sciences in 1998.

Selected works

Books
 Gabbe S, et al.. Obstetrics: Normal and Problem Pregnancies, 5th edn (Elsevier; 2007)

Research articles
 Landon MB, et al.. (2004) Maternal and perinatal outcomes associated with a trial of labor after prior cesarean delivery. N Engl J Med 351: 2581–2589 (full text)

References

Vanderbilt University faculty
Ohio State University faculty
University of Washington faculty
American medical researchers
American academic administrators
Living people
Year of birth missing (living people)
Members of the National Academy of Medicine